Kittlidiscidae is an extinct family  of Middle Triassic gastropods in the superfamily Pleurotomarioidea, named to contain the genus Kittlidiscus and included in the Vetigastropoda.

Note that  Bouchet & Rocroi, 2005 gives Vetigastropoda simply as a clade, which not being paraphyletic, it also is, leaving taxonomic ranking to a future date.  Other gastropod classifications, including those subsequent, have determined that the Vetigastropoda is a superorder.

Genera
The Kittlidiscidae includes the genus Kittlidiscus.

References

 
Gastropod families